Larry Willis may refer to:

Larry Willis (born 1942), American jazz pianist and composer
Larry Ray Willis (born 1963), American-born Canadian and Arena Football League player
Larry Willis (American football) (born 1948), American football safety